Heliactinidia nigrilinea is a moth of the subfamily Arctiinae. It was described by Francis Walker in 1865. It is found in Brazil.

References

Arctiinae
Moths described in 1865